Fazio is a surname and a given name. People with the name include:

People

Surname
 Amanda Fazio (born 1954), Australian politician
 Antonio Fazio (born 1936), Italian banker
 Buzz Fazio (1908–1993), American bowling star
 Ernie Fazio (1942–2017), American baseball player
 Federico Fazio (born 1987), Argentine footballer
 Ferruccio Fazio (born 1944), Italian physician and politician
 Foge Fazio (1938–2009), American football player and coach
 George Fazio (1912–1986), American golfer and golf course architect
 Giovanni Fazio, American physicist
 Justin Fazio (born 1997), Italian ice hockey player 
 Luis Fazio (1911–date of death unknown), Argentine footballer
 Mario Fazio (1919–1983), Italian racing cyclist
 Russell H. Fazio (born 1952), American social psychologist
 Ryan Fazio (born 1990), American politician
 Silvio Fazio (born 1952), Italian writer
 Tom Fazio (born 1945), golf course architect
 Victor H. Fazio (1942–2022), American politician

Given name
Fazio Cardano (1444–1524), Italian jurist and mathematician

Fictional characters
 Benny Fazio, a fictional character on the TV series The Sopranos

See also
Fazio (disambiguation)
DeFazio, list of people with a similar surname

Surnames of Italian origin
Italian masculine given names